Willie Bailey (born April 25, 1946) is an American politician. He is a member of the Mississippi House of Representatives from the 49th District, being first elected in 1994. He is a member of the Democratic Party.

References

1946 births
Living people
Democratic Party members of the Mississippi House of Representatives
African-American state legislators in Mississippi
21st-century American politicians
George Washington University alumni
People from Humphreys County, Mississippi